Chanbria regalis is a species of wind scorpion in the family Eremobatidae.

References

Solifugae
Articles created by Qbugbot
Animals described in 1951